The third season of the American television series Whose Line Is It Anyway? premiered on ABC on October 12, 2000, and concluded on June 14, 2001.

Cast

Recurring 
 Greg Proops (12 episodes)
 Kathy Greenwood (nine episodes)
 Chip Esten (eight episodes)
 Brad Sherwood (six episodes)
 Jeff Davis (three episodes)
 Robin Williams (one episode)

Episodes 

"Winner(s)" of each episode as chosen by hosts Drew Carey are highlighted in italics. The winner would take his or her seat and call a sketch for Drew to perform (often with the help of the rest).

A special titled "Best of Whose Line Is It Anyway?" aired on October 4, 2000, and was a clip show highlighting the series' first two seasons, hosted by Drew Carey.

References

External links
Whose Line Is It Anyway? (U.S.) (a Titles & Air Dates Guide)
Mark's guide to Whose Line is it Anyway? - Episode Guide

Whose Line Is It Anyway?
2000 American television seasons
2001 American television seasons